Zaz-e Gharbi Rural District is a rural district (dehestan) in Zaz va Mahru District, Aligudarz County, Lorestan Province, Iran. At the 2006 census, its population was 2,248, in 392 families.  The rural district has 22 villages.

References 

Rural Districts of Lorestan Province
Aligudarz County